Notational Velocity is a computer program for Mac OS X used for notetaking. It allows users to create notes using solely a computer keyboard and search them using incremental find. Other features include database encryption, basic text formatting, tags and spellcheck. In addition, users can synchronize notes with Simplenote and export to a variety of formats, including plain text, HTML and rich text. It has been recommended along with Simplenote as a solution for taking and syncing notes by both Wired and Lifehacker.

Notational Velocity hasn't seen any development activity since September 2011.

See also 
Comparison of notetaking software

References 

MacOS-only free software
Note-taking software